St Peter's College, Wexford is an Irish secondary school and former seminary located in Summerhill, overlooking Wexford town. It is a single-sex school for male pupils. Currently, the school's population is over 770.

History
Founded in 1811 by Most Rev. Patrick Ryan, Bishop of Ferns, the college has progressed from a Roman Catholic Seminary in Michael Street, Wexford to the present buildings. In 1818, the large house at Summerhill was purchased and Bishop Ryan blessed the foundation stone of an extension to be constructed to the rear of the house. In 1819, Bishop James Keating opened the new college and the President, staff and student body of Michael Street took up residence. Rev. Miles Murphy was the first president, he went on to become a Bishop. Expansion occurred for years afterwards and the impressive façade with its distinctive tower and the chapel designed by Augustus Welby Pugin were constructed. In 1855 the college became affiliated to the Catholic University of Ireland, in 1858 a theology course was offered to students. Up until 1897 students went on to finish their Theology and Philosophy courses St Patrick's College, Maynooth, (or another seminary), but from 1901 students completed their studies in St. Peter's and were ordained. Over 160 priests ordained for American dioceses were trained in St. Peter's.

In 1938, due to increasing numbers of students, a seminary wing was added to facilitate expansion. This wing is now occupied by the Wexford Campus of Institute of Technology, Carlow. The Seminary closed in 1999 and the 10 remaining students for the priesthood transferred to other seminaries, and new construction work was completed in 2001. In 2009, a new building was completed,  €3.5 Million, the building links the two older sections of the school and provides many specialist rooms such as CAD rooms and Physics Labs.
In 1988 the Christian Media Trust, was set up in St. Peter's, with radio studios and production facilities; this is an interdenominational grouping including representatives from Wexford's Church of Ireland, Methodist and Presbyterian Churches.  The group's programmes are broadcast on South East Radio on 95.6 FM. The building of the studio at St. Peter's was financed by Dr. Comiskey and the Ferns Diocese.

In 2005 the college featured prominently in The Ferns Report enquiry into paedophile activities in the Roman Catholic Church in the Diocese of Ferns.

Syllabus

The Junior certificate cycle subjects are: English, Irish, Mathematics, Geography, CSPE, History, Religion, Physical Education, Computer Studies & CSPE. The optional or 'choice' subjects are: French or German, Science, Technical Graphics, Material Technology (Wood), Music, Art & Business Studies.

St. Peter's also offer a Transition Year programme for students between Junior Certificate and Leaving Certificate cycles, which allows students to experience new subjects that are included in the Leaving Certificate as well as exclusive subjects purely for Transition Year.

The Leaving Certificate cycle include the mandatory Irish, English, Maths, and Religion and P.E., and subjects chosen from Chemistry, Biology, Physics, Applied Maths, French, German, History, Geography, Accounting, Economics, Agricultural Science, Art, Music, Business, Technical Drawing and Construction Studies.

Sport
In Gaelic games, the school won All Ireland finals in hurling in 1962, 1967, 1968 and 1973. Other successes include Leinster Hurling and Football championships. The college's more recent victories include the Senior Leinster A Football in 2017 and the Junior Leinster A Hurling 2007/8. The school has teams in basketball, handball and other sports. The school also won the Juvenile Leinster Football Final 2008/2009 and reached the final of the Juvenile Leinster Handball Final. In the GAA Centenary year of 1984 two students from the school won the All Ireland U15 Colleges Handball Doubles Final for the school at Croke Park.

Power Park
Power Park, the all-weather pitch commemorates the name of Ned Power – former Vice-Principal – who did so much to promote drama and games, not only in the College, but also in County Wexford.
.
Decisions were taken to close the boarding school 1997 and the Seminary in 1998. The Patron allocated a portion of the available rooms to the Secondary School. Substantial refurbishment of these buildings and the construction of a new extension was made possible through funding from the Department of Education & Science.

People Associated with St. Peter's College

Notable alumni

 John Banville – (b. 1945) novelist and screenwriter.
 Des Bishop – (b. 1975) Irish-American comedian
 Bishop Denis Brennan – (b. 1945) Current Bishop of Ferns, Wexford, appointed 2006.
 Bishop Abraham Brownrigg – (1836–1931), Catholic Bishop of Ossory, Kilkenny (1884–1928).
 Bishop Henry Cleary, O.B.E. – (1859–1929), Catholic Bishop of the Diocese of Auckland, New Zealand (1910–1929).
 Jamie Codd, jockey, finished second on Cause of Causes in the 2017 Grand National
 Prof. Arthur W. Conway FRS (1876–1950) Mathematical Physicist, President of University College Dublin (1940–1947).
 Donal Collins – Principal St Peter's College – (1988–1991). Jailed for indecent assault, gross indecency, buggery 1998 (d.2010).
 Bishop Aidan Deveraux DD (1801-1854), Vicars Apostolic of Cape of Good Hope(1847-1854), former pupil and latin professor in St Peter's Wexford.
 Seán Fortune – (1954 – 13 March 1999) Catholic priest accused of child molestation.
 Cardinal Tomás Ó Fiaich – (1923–1990) Catholic Archbishop of Armagh (1977), Primate of All Ireland (1977), Cardinal (1979).
 Daniel Furlong – (b. 1998) Winner of The All Ireland Talent Show, 2011.
 Bishop Thomas Grace – (1841–1921) Catholic Bishop of Sacramento, California (1896–1921).
 Neil Horan – (b. 1947) laicised Catholic priest, notorious for Grand Prix and Olympic marathon protests.
 Dr. James B. Kavanagh – (1800–1886), President of Carlow College (1864–1880).
 Archbishop Michael Kelly – (1850–1940) Catholic Archbishop of Sydney, Australia(1911–1940).
 Pat McCartan – (b. 1953) Irish Circuit Court judge, TD (1987–1992).
 Chris O'Neill – (b. 1990), YouTuber.
 Archbishop Redmond Prendiville – (1900–1968) Catholic Archbishop of the Archdiocese of Perth, Australia (1935–1968).
 Dr. Patrick Prendergast MRIA – 44th Provost of Trinity College, Dublin, appointed 2011.
 Bishop James David Richards (1828-1893), Bishop of Port Elizabeth, South Africa (1871-1893)
 Shaunaka Rishi Das – (b. 1961) Founder of the Oxford Centre for Hindu Studies, Hindu cleric.
 James Ryan – (1891–1970) founder-member of the Irish Volunteers, MP (1918–1919), TD (1919–1965) and Government Minister for much of that time.
 Bishop Laurence Bonaventure Sheil – (1815–1872) Catholic Bishop of Adelaide, Australia (1866–1872).
 Colm Tóibín – writer and critic.
 Bishop Dr. James Walshe – Bishop of Kildare and Leighlin (1856–1888), President of Carlow College (1850–1856).

Former presidents/principals
The first president of St. Peters was Rev. Miles Murphy. He was succeeded in 1829 by Rev. John Sinnott DD. In 1850 after the death of Dr. Sinnott, Rev. Lawrence Kirwan was appointed president. In 1858, Rev Patrick C Sheridan took over the post of president; he was followed in 1873 by Dr Kavanagh. Very Rev. Luke (Canon) Doyle, served as president of St. Peter's College, from 1890–1895. More recent presidents have included Very Rev. William F. Murphy STL, Rev. Laurence O'Connor, Very Rev. Dr. Thomas Sherwood, and Fr. Seamus S. De Vál who has written about the college.

As of 2020, the Principal of St. Peter's College is Mr. John Banville.

Institute of Technology, Carlow – Wexford Campus
The Institute of Technology, Carlow delivers courses at St. Peter's, in the former Seminary wing. There is approx. 900 students doing various full and part-time certificate, diploma, degree and masters courses in Business, Arts, Childhood studies, Visual Communications and Design, Sustainable Architectural Technology and Economics. 2012 saw the commencement of an MBA programme at the IT Carlow Wexford Campus.

References

Further reading
 A Nineteenth-Century Tabernacle, Séamas S. de Vál, The Past: The Organ of the Uí Cinsealaigh Historical Society, No. 22 (2000), pp. 67–69. Published by: Uí Cinsealaigh Historical Society.
 Sesquicentenary of St. Peter's College, Wexford, Séamas V. Ó Súilleabháin, The Past: The Organ of the Uí Cinsealaigh Historical Society, No. 8 (1970), pp. 52–59, Published by: Uí Cinsealaigh Historical Society.
 In the Shadow of Pugin: A Troubled Local Church, Colm Tóibín, The Furrow, Vol. 54, No. 6 (Jun. 2003), pp. 352–356, Published by: The Furrow.

External links
 St. Peter's College on The Wexford Web
 School's home page
 Hidden Wexford Genealogy – 1901 & 1911 census, St Peter's
 Ferns Diocese Website
School's Student Archive website
Article in memory of Ned Power, for whom Power Park is named

Boys' schools in the Republic of Ireland
Secondary schools in County Wexford
Educational institutions established in 1811
Catholic seminaries
Wexford, County Wexford
1811 establishments in Ireland